Decanal is an organic compound classified as an aldehyde with the chemical formula C10H20O.

Decanal may also refer to:

 An adjective referring to a person with the title of Dean

See also
 Decadal (disambiguation), referring to a period of 10 years